Bqosta is a  village in the Sidon District of the South Governorate in Lebanon.

History

In 1875 Victor Guérin traveled in the region, and noted: "Bekousta, a village of 200 inhabitants, Maronites and United Greeks; it is located on a high hill, between the Oued Naser to the south and the Nahr el-Aouleh to the north.[] The small church of Bekousta, dedicated to Saint Joseph, contains in its construction a number of ashlars of ancient appearance."

References

Bibliography

External links
Bqosta, Localiban 

Populated places in Sidon District
Maronite Christian communities in Lebanon